Peter Reicher was a politician in Slovenia during the first half of the 16th century when it was under the Holy Roman Empire. He became mayor of Ljubljana in 1529.
He was succeeded by Krištof Stern in 1530.

References

Mayors of places in the Holy Roman Empire
Mayors of Ljubljana
Year of birth missing
Year of death missing
16th-century Slovenian people